Heather Ann McComb (born March 2, 1977) is an American actress.

Career
McComb started acting at age two in a commercial for Publisher's Clearing House. In 1989 she played the title character in Francis Ford Coppola's segment, "Life Without Zoë", of the anthology film New York Stories. She played the part of Scout on the 1990 television program The Outsiders. The show only lasted one season. When she appeared in the telefilm Generation X in 1996, she became the first actress to portray the X-Men character Jubilee on screen. In 1997, McComb starred in the television series Profiler as Frances Malone. The next year she joined the cast of Party of Five in the part of Maggie.

Personal life
McComb was born in Lakewood Township, and raised in Barnegat Township, both in Ocean County, New Jersey. Her elder sister Jennifer Lynn McComb is also an actress.

On July 5, 2003, McComb married actor James Van Der Beek. They separated in April 2009, and on November 20, 2009, Van Der Beek filed for divorce. The divorce was finalized on March 31, 2010, and enforced on June 3, 2010.

Filmography

Film

Television

References

External links
 
 

1977 births
Living people
20th-century American actresses
21st-century American actresses
Actresses from New Jersey
American child actresses
American film actresses
American television actresses
People from Barnegat Township, New Jersey
People from Lakewood Township, New Jersey